Homoroselaps lacteus, also known as the spotted harlequin snake, is a species of atracaspidid snake. It is found in South Africa and Eswatini.

References

Atractaspididae
Snakes of Africa
Reptiles of Eswatini
Reptiles of South Africa
Taxa named by Carl Linnaeus
Reptiles described in 1758